The ARO 24 Series is a 4x4 off-road vehicle manufactured by ARO from 1969 to 2006 and mass produced from 1972. The engineers that designed Aro 240 were probably inspired by the second generation Fiat 1107 "Nuova Campagnola", while the first Fiat Campagnola was "inspired" by the Willys Jeep.

ARO 240 was the first of the ARO 24 series, which eventually included many other models: the four-door 241 and 244, the 242 pick-up, the three-door 243, the 320, 330 pick-ups, and many other body trims. Last special military versions were called ARO Dragon.

It is equipped with many different engines (both diesel and petrol options), and comes in both 4x2 and 4x4 versions. Notable improvements over the years were the introduction of Romanian Diesel engines, units equipped with Toyota engines, and units equipped with Romanian-built Turbo Diesel engines. The ARO-24s are no longer in production, as ARO was shut down.

Plans to market the ARO 244 in the United States as the Cross Lander 244X in 2005 were eventually cancelled. During the 1970s, 1980s and 1990s the original Romanian ARO 4X4 Series were also produced under alternative names often with modified running gear depending on the export market. In Portugal they were assembled in Setúbal south of Lisbon and locally known there as the PORTARO 4X4, in Spain they were called HISPARO 4X4, with a reshaped bodyshell and better equipped.

Engines

Petrol engines

Diesel engines

Versions

Off-road vehicles
ARO 240 3 door nine seater estate
ARO 241 a 4 door soft top five seater model
ARO 242 a 2 door closed cab pickup
ARO 243 a 3 door three seater van bodied model
ARO 244 a 4 door five seater estate model
ARO 245 Estate a 5 door deluxe model
ARO 246 Estate 5-door seven seater model

Light commercial vehicles
ARO 242 Regular Cab Pick-up
ARO 320 Regular Cab Pick-up
ARO 324 Double Cab Pick-up
ARO 328 TD Double Cab five seater
ARO 330 Long Cab Pick-up

Others Versions: 243 VAN, 263, 264, 266, 323 Ambulance, 324, 328 MT MaxiTaxi, 330, 330BB, 330C, 33N, 338TC, 350BC, 35S Ambulance, 35M, 429TC/TP.

Military vehicles
The ARO Dragon came in several variants to include different bodywork. There was even an armored variant.

The ARO Dragon Zivil was a civilian version of the Dragon.

Revisions
The first generation of ARO 24, between 1972 and 1976, had Dacia 1300 headlights and round taillights similar to the ARO M461. From 1977, round headlights were used like in the IMS and the rear lights were restyled. In 1985, a new front grille and smaller round headlights were introduced. Also, they were available with double headlights, that were used mostly on the 244. In 1995, the double headlight front design was slightly restyled and the rear lights were used Oltcit Club lamps. The last restyling, in 1998, was a slight facelift of the previous model and it introduced the so-called Toyota-type ornaments.

The vehicle was replaced by the ARO 10 Series of jeeps.

Gallery

See also
ARO M461
ARO 10 Series

References

Original Book The Complete Encyclopedia Of Four Wheel Drive Vehicles by Jiri Fiala from REBO Publishers International BV Holland 2004   

Original Book 4X4 Vehicles by John Carroll from Grange Books London England 1996 Regency House Publishing Limited

External links

24
Cars of Romania
Off-road vehicles
Sport utility vehicles
All-wheel-drive vehicles
1970s cars
1980s cars
1990s cars
2000s cars
Cars introduced in 1972